Rijssen-Holten (Sallaans: Riesn-Hooltn) is a municipality (Dutch: gemeente) in the eastern Netherlands, in the province of Overijssel.

The municipality was formed in 2001 by the joining of the municipalities of Holten and Rijssen. The area of Holten belongs to the region of Salland and the area of Rijssen to the region of Twente.

Population centres 

Only Holten and Rijssen have over 500 inhabitants.

Topography

Dutch Topographic map of the municipality of Rijssen-Holten, June 2015

Accessibility
Both Holten and Rijssen are easily accessible by car; the A1 motorway (Amsterdam - Berlin) is only a few kilometres away. Rijssen lies  more to the east.

Notable people 

 Johann Geusendam (1886 in Rijssen - 1945) political activist expelled from Bremen
 Bert Haanstra (1916 in Espelo – 1997) a Dutch director of films and documentaries 
 Jan Baan (born 1946 in Rijssen) a Dutch entrepreneur and venture capitalist
 Wolter Wierbos (born 1957 in Holten) a Dutch jazz trombonist

Sport 
 Jan Wegereef (born 1962 in Rijssen) a Dutch & FIFA football referee
 Eric Braamhaar (born 1966 in Rijssen) a Dutch & FIFA football referee
 Mark Tuitert (born 1980 in Holten) a Dutch speed skater and gold medallist at the 2010 Winter Olympics

Gallery

References

External links

Official website

 
Salland
Twente
Municipalities of Overijssel
Populated places in Overijssel
Municipalities of the Netherlands established in 2003